Andronikos Gizogiannis (born 1983) is a Greek professional basketball player. He is 2.03 m (6 ft 8 in) in height and he can play at the power forward and center positions. He is currently playing with Telethriakos Istiaias B.C,Telethriakos.

Professional career
Gizogiannis started his pro career with AGE Chalkida (2001–05). He then played with Apollon Patras (2005–07), Olympia Larissa (2007–08), Aigaleo (2008–09), AEK Athens (2009–10), AEK Argous (2010–11), Arkadikos (2011–12), and in August 2012, he returned to AEK Athens. In the summer of 2014, he moved to Ethnikos Piraeus.

National team career
1999 FIBA Europe Under-16 Championship: 
2002 FIBA Europe Under-20 Championship: 
2009 World Military Championship in Klaipėda, Lithuania:

References

External links 
 FIBA Profile
 FIBA Europe Profile
 Eurobasket.com Profile
 Draftexpress.com Profile
 AEK.com Profile

1983 births
Living people
AEK B.C. players
AGEH Gymnastikos B.C. players
Aigaleo B.C. players
Aiolos Astakou B.C. players
Apollon Patras B.C. players
Arkadikos B.C. players
Centers (basketball)
Ethnikos Piraeus B.C. players
Greek men's basketball players
Greek Basket League players
Olympia Larissa B.C. players
Power forwards (basketball)
Basketball players from Athens